The Orange Coast League is a high school athletic league that is part of the CIF Southern Section.

Members
 Calvary Chapel High School
 Costa Mesa High School
 Estancia High School
 Santa Ana High School 
 Orange High School 
 Saddleback High School
 St. Margaret's Episcopal School

References

CIF Southern Section leagues